Diamond Hill is a conspicuous snow-free hill which is diamond shape in plan, standing  east of Bastion Hill at the north side of the lower Darwin Glacier. Named by the Darwin Glacier Party of the Commonwealth Trans-Antarctic Expedition (1956–1958) which surveyed this area. Diamond Glacier is named for the hill.

References 

Geography of Antarctica